Trabzon University is a state university in Akçaabat, Trabzon. The university was established on May 8, 2018, including 5 faculties, 7 colleges, 1 state conservatory and an institute previously affiliated to Karadeniz Technical University.

Academic Units

Faculties 
 Fatih Education Faculty
 Faculty of fine arts
 Faculty of Law
 Faculty of Theology
 Communication faculty
 Sports Science Faculty

Schools 
 School of Applied Sciences

Vocational Schools 
 Beşikdüzü Vocational School
 Şalpazarı Vocational School
 Tonya Vocational School
 Vocational School of Tourism and Hotel Management
 Vakfıkebir Vocational School

Institutes 
 Institute of Postgraduate Education

State Conservatory

References 

2018 establishments in Turkey
Buildings and structures in Trabzon
Educational institutions established in 2018
State universities and colleges in Turkey
Trabzon